The Bachelor: Officer and a Gentleman is the tenth season of ABC reality television series The Bachelor. The show was filmed in Los Angeles, Hawaii, and Pennsylvania, and premiered on April 2, 2007. This season features the first US Navy Officer, 30-year-old Andy Baldwin from Lancaster, Pennsylvania.

The season concluded on May 21, 2007, Baldwin choosing to propose to 26-year-old social worker Tessa Horst. Horst became the first winner of Asian descent in the Bachelor franchise. The couple soon ended their engagement and briefly resumed dating, but finally broke up for good later that year.

Contestants
The following is the list of bachelorettes for this season:

Future Appearances

Bachelor Pad
Peyton Wright returned to compete for the first season of Bachelor Pad.  She and her partner Jesse Beck were eliminated in week 5, finishing in 7th/8th.

Call-Out Order

 The contestant received the first impression rose.
 The contestant was eliminated at the rose ceremony.
 The contestant received a rose on a date.
 The contestant was eliminated on a date.
 The contestant won the competition.

Episodes

About the winner
Tessa Horst grew up in Washington, D.C., where she graduated from Georgetown Day School in 1999 and Middlebury College in 2003. She received her MS degree in social work from Columbia University.  Prior to entering graduate studies, Horst lived in Jackson Hole, Wyoming in 2004, where she was employed at the famous Silver Dollar Bar of The Wort Hotel. At the time she competed on The Bachelor, she was employed as a social worker living in San Francisco.

Three months after the finale, Horst and Baldwin called off the engagement.

Controversy
Although the contestants are contractually obligated not to reveal the results of each round of elimination since the show is taped ahead of broadcast, various unsubstantiated media reports in advance of the final rose ceremony alleged that Horst revealed herself to be the winner. Horst later denied that she had been the source of this information. Some bachelorettes who were eliminated earlier in the series predicted Horst would be the successful recipient of the final rose.

References

External links
 ABC Official site of The Bachelor: Officer and a Gentleman

2007 American television seasons
Television shows filmed in California
Television shows filmed in Washington (state)
Television shows filmed in Connecticut
Television shows filmed in Washington, D.C.
Television shows filmed in Texas
Television shows filmed in Pennsylvania
Television shows filmed in Hawaii